Kaduvanoor  is a village in Bahour Commune of Bahour taluk  in the Union Territory of Puducherry, India. It is one of the 11 Enclaves of Puducherry district. Kaduvanur is a part of Manamedu Village no tea shop no hotel

Gallery

Politics
Kaduvanur is a part of Bahour (Union Territory Assembly constituency) which comes under Puducherry (Lok Sabha constituency).

References

External links
Official website of the Government of the Union Territory of Puducherry

Villages in Puducherry district